Birth Sign is the debut album by the American jazz guitarist George Freeman recorded in 1969 and released by the Delmark label.

Reception

Allmusic reviewer Michael G. Nastos stated "Chicago electric guitarist George Freeman was a quintessential sideman  ... This is his debut recording, done in the height of the soul-jazz era circa 1969 ... At times Freeman's sound traces to no single individual source, though it is steeped in Chi-Town blues and a progressive stance ... Too bad the world never really heard enough of George Freeman, and although this is a small taste, it is a more than adequate amuse-bouche".

Track listing
All compositions by George Freeman except where noted
 "Mama, Papa, Brother" – 5:39
 "Cough It Up" – 4:03
 "My Scenery" – 5:54
 "Must Be, Must Be" (Robin Kenyatta) – 5:30
 "Birth Sign" – 5:23
 "Hoss" – 6:57
 "My Ship" (Kurt Weill, Ira Gershwin) – 6:45

Personnel
George Freeman – guitar
Lester Lashley – trombone (track 4)
Von Freeman (tracks 2, 3, 6 & 7), Kalaparusha Maurice McIntyre (track 4) - tenor saxophone
Sonny Burke (tracks 1-3 & 4–6), Robert Pierce (track 4) – organ
Billy Mitchell – drums
Michael Cuscuna – arranger (track 4)

References

Delmark Records albums
1970 albums
George Freeman (guitarist) albums
Albums produced by Bob Koester